Great Pond (Truro) is one of three ponds in Barnstable County that share the name. The others are located in Eastham and Provincetown. The bottom is composed primarily of sand. The shoreline is lightly developed with residential homes.

Great Pond is located just east of Route 6 within the Cape Cod National Seashore. Anglers must park along the shoulder of Route 6 and walk in. A steep dirt path leads to a shallow cove at the eastern end of the pond. Access is suitable only for wading anglers, canoes and lightweight cartop boats.

Great Pond is generally quite acidic.  It has been limed in the past.  The state used to stock the pond with smallmouth bass and trout, but was not stocking it in 2018.

References

Ponds of Barnstable County, Massachusetts
Ponds of Massachusetts